James Thomas Clack (October 26, 1947 – April 7, 2006) was an American football center and guard in the National Football League (NFL).  He played for 11 seasons between 1971 and 1981.  He died of heart failure in 2006 after suffering from cancer for four years.

Clack graduated from Wake Forest University.  He began his career with the Pittsburgh Steelers, and he was part of two Super Bowl championship teams in 1974 and 1975.

In April 1978, the Steelers traded Clack (along with wide receiver Ernie Pough) to the New York Giants in exchange for offensive lineman John Hicks.  Clack spent four seasons with the Giants.

Clack was the Center who snapped the ball to Quarterback Joe Pisarcik.  Pisarcik fumbled the ball attempting to hand-off to Fullback Larry Csonka.  Hitting the hip of Csonka the ball bounced in to the hands of Herman Edwards who returned the fumble for a touchdown at the end of the November 19, 1978 game between the Giants and the Philadelphia Eagles at Giants Stadium, costing the team a certain victory in a play since known as "The Miracle at the Meadowlands" to Eagles' fans and "The Fumble" to Giants' fans.  The last second win propelled the Eagles into the playoffs and prompted the NFL to adopt the "kneel down" play, otherwise known as the "victory formation" to end games.   

Clack was inducted into the Wake Forest's hall of fame in 1981, and into the North Carolina Sports Hall of Fame in 2004.

References

1947 births
2006 deaths
New York Giants players
Pittsburgh Steelers players
Wake Forest Demon Deacons football players
Players of American football from North Carolina
Sportspeople from Rocky Mount, North Carolina
Continental Football League players